The National Medal for Museum and Library Service is an award given annually by the Institute of Museum and Library Services  (IMLS) to American libraries and museums with outstanding service to their communities. The IMLS refers to the medal as "the nation’s highest honor conferred on museums and libraries for service to the community." The award is typically presented by the First Lady of the United States.

From 1994 to 1999, the award was known as the National Award for Museum Service and given to museums only.  From 2000 to 2006, it was awarded to three museums and three libraries annually, and was known as the "National Award for Museum and Library Service".  From 2007 to the present, it has borne its present name, and been awarded to five museums and five libraries.

The lists of awardees for 1994–2009 are drawn from the 2009 medals booklet, published by the IMLS.

1994

Brukner Nature Center, Troy, Ohio
The Cummer Museum of Art and Gardens, Jacksonville, Florida
Missouri Historical Society, St. Louis, Missouri

1995
Brooklyn Children's Museum, Brooklyn, New York
The Mexican Fine Arts Center Museum, Chicago, Illinois
Montshire Museum of Science, Norwich, Vermont
The Wing Luke Asian Museum, Seattle, Washington

1996
The Corcoran Gallery of Art, Washington, DC
The Field Museum, Chicago, Illinois
The Natural Science Center of Greensboro, Greensboro, North Carolina

1997
The Children's Museum of Indianapolis, Indianapolis, Indiana
The Museum of Fine Arts, Houston, Texas
National Aquarium in Baltimore, Baltimore, Maryland

1998
Belknap Mill Society, Laconia, New Hampshire
Henry Ford Museum & Greenfield Village, Dearborn, Michigan
New Jersey Historical Society, Newark, New Jersey

1999
Lincoln Park Zoo, Chicago, Illinois
Nevada Museum of Art, Reno, Nevada
St. Simons Island Lighthouse Museum, St. Simons Island, Georgia

2000

In 2000, the first year that the award was given to libraries, the following seven institutions received it:

Albright-Knox Art Gallery, Buffalo, New York
Alutiiq Museum & Archaeological Repository, Kodiak, Alaska
B.B. Comer Memorial Library, Sylacauga, Alabama
Queens Borough Public Library, Jamaica, New York
Simon Wiesenthal Center Library and Archives, Los Angeles, California
Urie Elementary School Library, Lyman, Wyoming
Youth Museum of Southern West Virginia, Beckley, West Virginia

2001
Alaska Resources Library and Information Services, Anchorage, Alaska
Children's Discovery Museum of San Jose, San Jose, California
Hancock County Library System, Bay St. Louis, Mississippi
Miami Museum of Science, Miami, Florida
New England Aquarium, Boston, Massachusetts
Providence Public Library, Providence, Rhode Island

2002
Boundary County District Library, Bonners Ferry, Idaho
Hartford Public Library, Hartford, Connecticut
Please Touch Museum, Philadelphia, Pennsylvania
Southern Alleghenies Museum of Art, Loretto, Pennsylvania
Southwest Georgia Regional Public Library System, Bainbridge, Georgia
Wildlife Conservation Society/Bronx Zoo, Bronx, New York

2003
Bozeman Public Library, Bozeman, Montana
Carnegie Science Center, Pittsburgh, Pennsylvania
Free Library of Philadelphia, Philadelphia, Pennsylvania
Pocahontas County Free Libraries, Marlinton, West Virginia
San Angelo Museum of Fine Arts, San Angelo, Texas
USS Constitution Museum, Boston, Massachusetts

2004
Chicago Botanic Garden, Chicago, Illinois
Flint Public Library, Flint, Michigan
Mayagüez Children's Library, Mayagüez, Puerto Rico
The Regional Academic Health Center Medical Library of the University of Texas Health Science Center, San Antonio, Texas
Western Folklife Center, Elko, Nevada
Zoological Society of San Diego, San Diego, California

2005
COSI Toledo, Toledo, Ohio
Johnson County Library, Overland Park, Kansas
Levine Museum of the New South, Charlotte, North Carolina
Mathews Memorial Library, Mathews, Virginia
Pratt Museum, Homer, Alaska
Saint Paul Public Library, Saint Paul, MN

2006
Artrain USA, Ann Arbor, Michigan
Frankfort Community Public Library, Frankfort, Indiana
John G. Shedd Aquarium, Chicago, Illinois
Lincoln Children's Zoo, Lincoln, NE
Public Library of Charlotte and Mecklenburg County, Charlotte, North Carolina
San Antonio Public Library, San Antonio, Texas

2007
Birmingham Civil Rights Institute, Birmingham, Alabama
Brookfield Zoo of the Chicago Zoological Society, Brookfield, Illinois
Georgetown County Library, Georgetown, South Carolina
Kim Yerton Branch of the Humboldt County Library, Hoopa, California
Memphis Public Library & Information Center, Memphis, Tennessee
National Museum of Women in the Arts, Washington, DC
The Newberry Library, Chicago, Illinois
Ocean County Library, Toms River, New Jersey
Oregon Museum of Science and Industry, Portland, Oregon
Vermont Historical Society, Barre, Vermont

2008
Buffalo Bill Historical Center, Cody, Wyoming
The Franklin Institute, Philadelphia, Pennsylvania
General Lew Wallace Study and Museum, Crawfordsville, Indiana
Jane Stern Dorado Community Library, Dorado, Puerto Rico
Kansas City Public Library, Kansas City, Missouri
Lower East Side Tenement Museum, New York, New York
Miami-Dade Public Library System, Miami, Florida
Norton Museum of Art, West Palm Beach, Florida
Skidompha Public Library, Damariscotta, Maine
Skokie Public Library, Skokie, Illinois

2009

Braille Institute Library Services, Los Angeles, California
Children's Museum of Pittsburgh, Pittsburgh, Pennsylvania
Cincinnati Museum Center at Union Terminal, Cincinnati, Ohio
Gail Borden Public Library, Elgin, Illinois
Indianapolis Museum of Art, Indianapolis, Indiana
Multnomah County Library, Portland, Oregon
Museum of Science & Industry, Tampa, Florida
Pritzker Military Museum & Library, Chicago, Illinois
Stark County District Library, Canton, Ohio
Tennessee Aquarium, Chattanooga, Tennessee

2010
In 2010, the award was given to the following ten libraries and museums:

Conner Prairie Interactive History Park, Fishers, Indiana
Explora, Albuquerque, New Mexico
Japanese American National Museum, Los Angeles, California
Mississippi Museum of Art, Jackson, MS
Nashville Public Library, Nashville, Tennessee
The New York Botanical Garden, Bronx, New York
Patchogue-Medford Library, Patchogue, New York
Peter White Public Library, Marquette, Michigan
Rangeview Library District and Anythink Libraries, Adams County, Colorado
West Bloomfield Township Public Library, West Bloomfield Township, Michigan

2011
In 2011, the award was given to the following ten libraries and museums:

Alachua County Library District, Gainesville, Florida
Brooklyn Museum, Brooklyn, New York
Columbus Metropolitan Library, Columbus, Ohio
EdVenture Children's Museum, Columbia, South Carolina
Erie Art Museum, Erie, Pennsylvania
Hill Museum & Manuscript Library, Collegeville, Minnesota
Lewis Ginter Botanical Garden, Richmond, Virginia
Madison Children's Museum, Madison, Wisconsin
San Jose Public Library, San Jose, California
Weippe Public Library & Discovery Center, Weippe, Idaho

2012

In 2012, the award was given to the following ten libraries and museums:

Bootheel Youth Museum, Malden, Missouri
Contra Costa County Library, Pleasant Hill, California
Cumberland County Public Library, Fayetteville, North Carolina
Garfield Park Conservatory, Chicago, Illinois
Long Island Children's Museum, Garden City, New York
Museum of Contemporary Art, North Miami, Florida
Naturita Community Library, Naturita, Colorado
Pacific Science Center, Seattle, Washington
Park View High School Library Media Center, Sterling, Virginia
Shaler North Hills Library, Glenshaw, Pennsylvania

2013
In 2013, the award was given to the following ten libraries and museums, and presented by First Lady Michelle Obama:

Boston Children's Museum, Boston, Massachusetts
Columbus Museum of Art, Columbus, Ohio
Delta Blues Museum, Clarksdale, Mississippi
Discovery Science Center, Santa Ana, California
Marshalltown Public Library, Marshalltown, Iowa
National Czech & Slovak Museum & Library, Cedar Rapids, Iowa
Pierce County Library System, Tacoma, Washington
Public Library of Cincinnati and Hamilton County, Cincinnati, Ohio
Rancho Cucamonga Public Library, Rancho Cucamonga, California
Waukegan Public Library, Waukegan, Illinois

2014
In 2014, the award was given to the following ten libraries and museums:
Chicago Public Library, Chicago, Illinois
Brooklyn Botanic Garden, Brooklyn, New York
Las Vegas-Clark County Library District, Las Vegas, Nevada
Mid-Continent Public Library, Independence, Missouri
Mystic Aquarium, Mystic, Connecticut
North Carolina Museum of Natural Sciences, Raleigh, North Carolina
Octavia Fellin Public Library, Gallup, New Mexico
Sam Noble Oklahoma Museum of Natural History, Norman, Oklahoma
The Children's Museum of Indianapolis, Indianapolis, Indiana
Yiddish Book Center, Amherst, Massachusetts

2015
In 2015, the award was given to the following ten libraries and museums:
Amazement Square, Lynchburg, Virginia
Cecil County Public Library, Elkton, Maryland
Craig Public Library, Craig, Alaska
Embudo Valley Library and Community Center, Dixon, New Mexico
Los Angeles Public Library, Los Angeles, California
Louisiana Children’s Museum, New Orleans, Louisiana
Museum of Northern Arizona, Flagstaff, Arizona
New York Hall of Science, Queens, New York
The Schomburg Center for Research in Black Culture, New York, New York
The Tech Museum of Innovation, San Jose, California

2016
In 2016, the award was given to the following ten libraries and museums:
Brooklyn Public Library, Brooklyn, New York
The Chicago History Museum, Chicago, Illinois
Columbia Museum of Art, Columbia, South Carolina
Lynn Meadows Discovery Center for Children, Gulfport, Mississippi
Madison Public Library, Madison, Wisconsin
Mid-America Science Museum, Hot Springs, Arkansas
North Carolina State University Libraries, Raleigh, North Carolina
Otis Library, Norwich, Connecticut
Santa Ana Public Library, Santa Ana, California
Tomaquag Museum, Exeter, Rhode Island

2017
In 2017, the award was given to the following ten libraries and museums:
Alaska State Museums, Juneau, Alaska
Aspen Art Museum, Aspen, Colorado
Cedar Rapids Public Library, Cedar Rapids, Iowa
Illinois Holocaust Museum & Education Center, Skokie, Illinois
Leigh Yawkey Woodson Art Museum, Wausau, Wisconsin
Long Beach Public Library, Long Beach, California
Peralta Hacienda Historical Park, Oakland, California
Richland Library, Columbia, South Carolina
University of Minnesota Libraries, Minneapolis, Minnesota
Waterville Public Library, Waterville, Maine

2018
In 2018, the award was given to the following ten libraries and museums:
Children's Museum of Denver at Marsico Campus, Denver, Colorado
Detroit Historical Museum, Detroit, Michigan
El Paso Museum of Art, El Paso, Texas
Georgetown Public Library, Georgetown, Texas
History Museum at the Castle, Appleton, Wisconsin
Orange County Library System, Orlando, Florida
Pueblo City–County Library District, Pueblo, Colorado
Reading Public Library, Reading, Pennsylvania
Rochester Public Library, Rochester, Minnesota
University of Oregon Museum of Natural and Cultural History, Eugene, Oregon

2019
In 2019, the award was given to the following ten libraries and museums:  
Jamestown S'Klallam Tribal Library, Sequim, Washington
Interuniversity Consortium for Political and Social Research at University of Michigan, Ann Arbor, Michigan
New Haven Free Public Library, New Haven, Connecticut
Gulfport Public Library, Gulfport, Florida
Meridian District Library, Meridian, Idaho
Barona Cultural Center and Museum, Lakeside, California
Children's Museum, San Diego, California
Historical Society of Central Florida, Orlando, Florida
Lorraine Civil Rights Museum, Memphis, Tennessee
South Carolina Aquarium, Charleston, South Carolina

2020
No awards were made in 2020.

2021
In 2021, the award was given to the following six libraries and museums:

Cabell County Public Library, Huntington, West Virginia
Highwood Public Library, Highwood, Illinois
Memphis Public Libraries, Memphis, Tennessee
High Desert Museum, Bend, Oregon
Mississippi Children's Museum, Jackson, Mississippi
Museo de Arte de Ponce, Ponce, Puerto Rico

References

National Medal
National Medal
American awards